is a railway station on the Kagoshima Main Line, operated by JR Kyushu in Tamana, Kumamoto Prefecture, Japan.

Lines
Local and rapid services on the line stop at the station.

Layout
The station consists of two side platforms serving two tracks. The station building is a modern concrete structure which houses a ticket window and a waiting room. There is also an exhibition area featuring artefacts, pictures and part of the roof of the old station building. The roof exhibit has bullet marks caused by a strafing run against the station by a U.S. Lockheed P-38 Lightning fighter during the Second World War. Access to the opposite side platform is by means of a footbridge. The station is not staffed by JR but some types of tickets are available from a kan'i itaku agent who staffs the ticket window.

Adjacent stations

History
Japanese Government Railways (JGR) opened the station on 28 November 1928 as an additional station on the existing track of the Kagoshima Main Line. With the privatization of Japanese National Railways (JNR), the successor of JGR, on 1 April 1987, JR Kyushu took over control of the station.

Passenger statistics
In fiscal 2016, the station was used by an average of 368 passengers daily (boarding passengers only), and it ranked 280th among the busiest stations of JR Kyushu.

See also 
List of railway stations in Japan

References

External links
Ōnoshimo (JR Kyushu)

Railway stations in Kumamoto Prefecture
Railway stations in Japan opened in 1928